McGarrell is a surname. Notable people with the surname include:

Flo McGarrell (1974–2010), American artist, filmmaker, writer, and arts administrator
James McGarrell (1930–2020), American painter and printmaker
Neil McGarrell (born 1972), Guyanese cricketer

See also

McCarrell